Phenylarsonic acid is the chemical compound with the formula C6H5AsO(OH)2, commonly abbreviated PhAsO3H2.  This colourless solid is an organic derivative of arsenic acid, AsO(OH)3, where one OH group has been replaced by a phenyl group.  The compound is a buffering agent and a precursor to other organoarsenic compounds, some of which are used in animal nutrition, e.g. 4-hydroxy-3-nitrobenzenearsonic acid.

Preparation and structure
PhAsO3H2 can be prepared in several routes, but a common one entails treatment of phenyl diazonium salts with sodium arsenite (prepared from arsenious acid and base) in the presence of a copper(II) catalyst.
  +  NaAsO3H2  →  C6H5AsO3H2  +  Na+  +  N2
Related derivatives are prepared similarly.  It was first prepared by Michaelis and Loenser. X-ray crystallography indicates that the molecules are connected by hydrogen-bonds consistent with short distance of 2.5 Å separating the oxygen atoms.  The arsenic center is tetrahedral.

Related phenylarsonic acids
Several derivatives of phenylarsonic acid have been used as additives for animal feeds.  These include 4-hydroxy-3-nitrobenzenearsonic acid (3-NHPAA, or Roxarsone),  p-arsanilic acid (p-ASA), 4-nitrophenylarsonic acid (4-NPAA), and  p-ureidophenylarsonic acid (p-UPAA).

References

Phenyl compounds
Arsonic acids